Viscount Canterbury, of the City of Canterbury, was a title in the Peerage of the United Kingdom. It was created in 1835 for the Tory politician Sir Charles Manners-Sutton, who had previously served as Speaker of the House of Commons. He was created Baron Bottesford, of Bottesford in the County of Leicester, at the same time, also in the Peerage of the United Kingdom. Manners-Sutton was the son of the Most Reverend Charles Manners-Sutton, Archbishop of Canterbury, fourth son of Lord George Manners-Sutton, third son of John Manners, 3rd Duke of Rutland. His uncle was Thomas Manners-Sutton, 1st Baron Manners, Lord Chancellor of Ireland.

Lord Canterbury was succeeded by his eldest son, the second Viscount. He died unmarried and was succeeded by his younger brother. He was a politician and colonial administrator. The titles descended from father to son until the death of his grandson, the fifth Viscount, in 1918. The late Viscount was succeeded by his first cousin, the sixth Viscount. He was the son of the Hon. Graham Edward Henry Manners-Sutton, younger son of the third Viscount. Lord Canterbury had no sons and on his death in 1941 both titles became extinct.

Viscounts Canterbury (1835)
Charles Manners-Sutton, 1st Viscount Canterbury (1780–1845)
Charles John Manners-Sutton, 2nd Viscount Canterbury (1812–1869)
John Henry Thomas Manners-Sutton, 3rd Viscount Canterbury (1814–1877)
Henry Charles Manners-Sutton, 4th Viscount Canterbury (1839–1914)
Henry Frederick Walpole Manners-Sutton, 5th Viscount Canterbury (1879–1918)
Charles Graham Manners-Sutton, 6th Viscount Canterbury (1872–1941)

See also
Duke of Rutland
Baron Manners

References

Attribution

Noble titles created in 1835
Noble titles created for UK MPs
Extinct viscountcies in the Peerage of the United Kingdom
Canterbury